Barclay House may refer to:

in the United States (by state)
Barclay Farm House, Cherry Hill, New Jersey
Hanckel-Barclay House, Brevard, North Carolina
Barclay–Klum House, Ashland, Oregon, listed on the National Register of Historic Places
Dr. Forbes Barclay House, Oregon City, Oregon
Barclay House (Bedford, Pennsylvania)
Barclay House (West Chester, Pennsylvania)
Barclay-Bryan House, Temple, Texas, listed on the National Register of Historic Places

Barclays House, Poole, England